Forgiveness is a 2021 Mexican-American experimental horror film directed and written by Alex Kahuam. The film premiered at FrightFest in the United Kingdom.

Premise
Magnea, Camila and Aisha wake up in a hospital, with no memories of how they got there. They each find out they've been forever altered: one is blind, one is deaf, one is mute. They will have to find a way out or they'll die.

Cast

Reception
On Rotten Tomatoes, the film holds an approval rating of 60% based on 5 reviews, with an average rating of 5.80/10. Martin Unsworth of Starburst magazine wrote:"Forgiveness is packed full of disturbing imagery with a surreal edge and is terrifyingly mesmerising."

Accolades

References

External links
 
 Forgiveness on Letterboxd.com

2021 films
2020s English-language films

2020s American films